Thaumatopsis floridella, the Floridian grass-veneer, is a moth in the family Crambidae. It was described by William Barnes and James Halliday McDunnough in 1913. It is found in North America, where it has been recorded from coastal areas in Florida, Georgia, Mississippi, South Carolina and North Carolina, New Jersey, New York, and Rhode Island. It is also found in Cuba.

The wingspan is 23–31 mm. Adults are on wing from May to September.

References

Crambini
Moths described in 1913
Moths of North America